George P. Shadid (May 15, 1929 – February 3, 2018) was an American Democratic politician. He was sheriff of Peoria County, Illinois from 1976 to 1993 and was in the Illinois State Senate from 1993 until 2006.

Background
Shadid was born in Clinton, Iowa to immigrants from Lebanon.  At age 14, once in Peoria, Illinois, Shadid worked with future mayor Jim Maloof at the Maloof family cleaning business. They remained friends until Maloof's death.

Career
Shadid became a police officer in 1953.  In 1976, he ran for sheriff of Peoria County.  Running as a Democrat, with a Republican campaign manager, he became the first Democrat elected as Peoria County sheriff since 1892.  He took up the office of sheriff in December 1976.  The 1985 jail and sheriff's complex on Maxwell Road was built during his tenure.

By 1993, Shadid was living near Edwards.  In 1993, the Illinois State Senate 46th Senate District seat was vacated by Richard Luft of Pekin when Luft was appointed Illinois Commissioner of Banks and Trusts.  Shadid was unanimously chosen as a replacement by Democratic leaders of the district, and was appointed to the Illinois State Senate on May 13, 1993.  Al Meisner was appointed to replace Shadid as sheriff.

Shadid retired from the Senate in December 2006 to allow his elected successor, Democrat David Koehler, to take office earlier.

Personal life and death

George Shadid had two sons. James E. "Jim" Shadid, is a federal judge.  George Shadid Jr., died in 2005.

In 2013, Shadid donated his remaining campaign funds to Bradley University.  In November 2014, the Peoria County jail complex on Maxwell Road was named the George P. Shadid Law Enforcement Center.

George Shadid died age 88 on February 3, 2018, of natural causes  in Peoria.

References

1929 births
2018 deaths
American politicians of Lebanese descent
Politicians from Clinton, Iowa
Politicians from Peoria, Illinois
Illinois sheriffs
Democratic Party Illinois state senators